East Snow Mountain Falls is a seasonal waterfall in the Sierra Nevada in Placer County, California. At , it is the second tallest measured waterfall in California after Yosemite Falls. The falls are a long cascade consisting of dozens of smaller drops. Due to the small size of its drainage basin, the falls usually flow only from December through July.

The falls occur on an unnamed stream on the eastern face of Snow Mountain, which drains into the Royal Gorge of the North Fork American River. They are accessed by a strenuous , one-way hike from Cascade Lakes, near Soda Springs.

See also
List of waterfalls of California
New York Canyon Falls

Notes

Landforms of Placer County, California
Waterfalls of California